Sir George Hungerford (1637–1712), of Cadenham House, Bremhill, Wiltshire, was an English country gentleman and member of parliament.

He was the son of Edward Hungerford of Cadenham by Susan, daughter of Sir John Pretyman of Driffield, Gloucestershire, sister of Sir John Pretyman, 1st Baronet. He was a Member of the Parliament of England for Cricklade in the period 1661 – Jan. 1679, for Calne from October 1679 to March 1681 and for Wiltshire from 1695 to November 1701.

References

1637 births
1712 deaths
English MPs 1661–1679
English MPs 1679
Members of the Parliament of England (pre-1707) for Cricklade
Members of the Parliament of England (pre-1707) for Calne
Members of the Parliament of England (pre-1707) for Wiltshire
English MPs 1695–1698
English MPs 1698–1700